Group 2 of the UEFA Women's Euro 2017 qualifying competition consisted of five teams: Spain, Finland, Republic of Ireland, Portugal, and Montenegro. The composition of the eight groups in the qualifying group stage was decided by the draw held on 20 April 2015.

The group was played in home-and-away round-robin format. The group winners qualified directly for the final tournament, while the runners-up also qualified directly if they were one of the six best runners-up among all eight groups (not counting results against the fifth-placed team); otherwise, the runners-up advance to the play-offs.

Standings

Matches
Times are CEST (UTC+2) for dates between 29 March and 24 October 2015 and between 27 March and 29 October 2016, for other dates times are CET (UTC+1).

Goalscorers
8 goals

 Verónica Boquete

6 goals

 Cláudia Neto
 Sonia Bermúdez

5 goals

 Áine O'Gorman
 Stephanie Roche
 Vicky Losada

4 goals

 Edite Fernandes
 Jennifer Hermoso
 Alexia Putellas
 Amanda Sampedro

3 goals

 Emmi Alanen
 Linda Sällström
 Louise Quinn
 Virginia Torrecilla

2 goals

 Jenny Danielsson
 Natalia Kuikka
 Dolores Silva
 Irene Paredes

1 goal

 Sanni Franssi
 Nora Heroum
 Emma Koivisto
 Ria Öling
 Maija Saari
 Sanna Saarinen
 Slađana Bulatović
 Armisa Kuč
 Ana Borges
 Carole Costa
 Carolina Mendes
 Megan Connolly
 Ruesha Littlejohn
 Denise O'Sullivan
 Fiona O'Sullivan
 Marta Corredera
 Marta Torrejón

1 own goal

 Tatjana Djurković (playing against Finland)
 Sophie Perry (playing against Spain)

References

External links
Standings, UEFA.com

Group 2
2015–16 in Spanish women's football
2016–17 in Spanish women's football
2015–16 in Portuguese football
2016–17 in Portuguese football
2015–16 in Montenegrin football
2016–17 in Montenegrin football
2015 in Finnish football
2016 in Finnish football
2015–16 in Republic of Ireland women's association football
2016–17 in Republic of Ireland women's association football